The fourth election to the Llandeilo Rural District Council was held in March 1904. It was preceded by the 1901 election and followed by the 1907 election. The successful candidates were also elected to the Llandeilo Board of Guardians.

There were a number of unopposed returns in the rural parishes.

Boundary Changes
Following the formation of Ammanford Urban District Council in 1903, the number of seats for the Betws and Llandybie parishes were reduced as parts of these parishes formed the new Urban District.

Ward Results

Bettws (two seats)

Brechfa (one seat)

Glynamman (one seat)

Llandebie (two seats)

Llandebie, Blaenau (two seats)

Llandeilo Fawr North Ward (three seats)

Llandeilo Fawr South Ward (two seats)

Llandyfeisant (one seat)

Llanegwad (three seats)

J.G. Davies won back the seat he lost three years previously.

Llanfihangel Aberbythych (two seats)

Llanfihangel Cilfragen (one seat)

Llanfynydd (two seats)

Llangathen (two seats)

Llansawel (two seats)

Quarter Bach No.1 (one seat)

Quarter Bach No.2 (one seat)

Talley (two seats)

References

1904 Welsh local elections
Elections in Carmarthenshire
20th century in Carmarthenshire